Chitral hydel power is a hydroelectric power station which is located on the right bank of Lutkho river and 5 Km upstream of Chitral city. The flow of Lutkho river was diverted by a 3.72 Km long channel. The power station is equipped with 2 units of 200 kW and 2 units of 300 kW each to cumulatively generate 1 MW of electricity. The power generated from the power station is being provided to the Chitral city through an 11 kV transmission line. The project was commissioned in 1975.

See also 

 List of dams and reservoirs in Pakistan
 List of power stations in Pakistan
 Satpara Dam
 Allai Khwar Hydropower Project
 Gomal Zam Dam

References 

Dams in Pakistan
Hydroelectric power stations in Pakistan
Dams on the Kabul River
Chitral District
Buildings and structures in Khyber Pakhtunkhwa
Roller-compacted concrete dams
Run-of-the-river power stations